Darren Lawson (born 30 March 1968) is an Australian former cyclist. He competed in the team time trial at the 1992 Summer Olympics.

References

External links
 

1968 births
Living people
Australian male cyclists
Olympic cyclists of Australia
Cyclists at the 1992 Summer Olympics
Place of birth missing (living people)